Aozora Bunko (literally the "Blue Sky Library", also known as the "Open Air Library") is a Japanese digital library. This online collection encompasses several thousands of works of Japanese-language fiction and non-fiction. These include out-of-copyright books or works that the authors wish to make freely available.

Since its inception in 1997, Aozora Bunko has been both the compiler and publisher of an evolving online catalog. In 2006, Aozora Bunko organized to add a role as a public policy advocate to protect its current and anticipated catalog of freely accessible e-books.

History and operation

Aozora Bunko was created on the Internet in 1997 to provide broadly available, free access to Japanese literary works whose copyrights had expired. The driving force behind the project was Michio Tomita (:ja:富田倫生, 1952–2013), who was motivated by the belief that people with a common interest should cooperate with each other.

In Japan, Aozora Bunko is considered similar to Project Gutenberg. Most of the texts provided are Japanese literature, and some translations from English literature. The resources are searchable by category, author, or title; and there is a considerable amount of support in how to use the database in the form of detailed explanations. The files can be downloaded in PDF format or simply viewed in HTML format.

Aozora Bunko currently includes more than 15,100 works .

Public-policy advocacy organization

Aozora Bunko joined with others in organizing to oppose changes in Japanese copyright law. That opposition has led to encouraging Japanese citizens to submit letters and petitions to the Japanese Cultural Affairs Agency and to members of the Diet.

[[File:N0-70.png|thumb|right|160px|Graphic icon illustrating Aozora Bunko'''s public-policy advocacy position—opposing proposed changes to Japan's copyright laws.]]

Japan and other countries accepted the terms of the Berne Convention for the Protection of Literary and Artistic Works, an 1886 international agreement about common copyright policies. Aozora Bunko adopted an advocacy role in favor of continuing with a status quo of laws that do not go beyond the minimum copyright terms of the Berne Convention have copyrights that run for the lifetime of the author plus 50 years as preferable to changes proposed by a number of powerful forces.

The evolution of Aozora Bunko from a digital library to a public-policy advocacy organization is an unintended consequence which developed only after the perceived threat to the Aozora Bunko catalog and mission became otherwise unavoidable.

ProblemsAozora Bunko pointed that extension of the copyright term had been influenced from the document, "The U.S.-Japan Regulatory Reform and Competition Policy Initiative." Through these annual reports, The U.S. Government was requiring that the protected period of copyright should be extended to the Japanese government: 70 years after one's death for a work by an individual, and 95 years after publication for a work by a corporation. In response, the Agency for Cultural Affairs in Japan has expressed that a conclusion was obtained at the Council for Cultural Affairs copyright subcommittee by the end of 2007. If the legal revision which extends a protected period will be actually carried out, Aozora Bunko would be forced not to publish books which have already and almost been published because of the 20 years' extension of protection of copyright. Therefore, Aozora Bunko released the counter declaration against enforcement of the revised law on 1 January 2005; they started to collect the signatures for a petition on 1 January 2007.

Due to the regime change in 2009 in Japan, Japanese government stopped to receive these reports from the U.S. government. Aozora Bunko does not show any responses toward that and their petition calling for opposition against the extension of copyright term stopped from the modification of October 2008. Instead of the document, the website of embassy of the United States inserted the "UNITED STATES-JAPAN ECONOMIC HARMONIZATION INITIATIVE" in February 2011. In the document, The U.S. government promoted the extension of copyright law for protection of intellectual property rights toward Japanese government so that it was "in line with emerging global trends, including those of its OECD counterparts and major trading partners."

On 30 December 2018, Japan did extend the period to 70 years, which was a requirement stemming from the EU–Japan Economic Partnership Agreement.

See also
 Wikisource
 List of digital library projects
 Open Content Alliance
 UK:Gowers Review of Intellectual Property
 US:Copyright Term Extension Act
 Project Runeberg
 Open Rights Group
 Philosophy of copyright
 Permission culture
 Japanese Historical Text Initiative

Notes

References

 Bovens, Andreas (2005). "Closed Architectures for Content Distribution," Japan Media Review (University of Southern California, Annenberg School for Communication); Yale University Conference (2004), "Reproduction in Modern Japan" -- paper abstract
 Donovan, Maureen H. (2006). Accessing Japanese Digital Libraries: Three Case Studies. Berlin: Springer. .
 Lessig, Lawrence (2004). Free Culture: How Big Media Uses Technology and the Law to Lock Down Culture and Control Creativity. New York: Penguin Press. ,  (cloth)
 Tamura, Aya. "Novelists, others want copyright protection extended", The Japan Times Online. September 30, 2006.
 Tomita, Michio. "Enable Library, Aozora Bunko as an 'Enable Library'". Gendai no Toshokan. Vol. 37, No. 3, pp. 176–181 (1999).
 Tomita, Michio. "Dream of perpetual Aozora Bunko, a private electronic library," Art research'' (Ritsumeikan University). Vol.2, pp. 49–56 (2001).
 Yamamoto, Shuichiro. "What Is Knowledge That Generates Value?" Science Links Japan web site (2008).

External links 
   
 Aozora Bunko official blog 
 The Future of Books Fund 

Ebook suppliers
Japanese digital libraries
Intellectual property activism
Japanese literature